The Bold Frontiersman is a 1948 American Western film directed by Philip Ford and written by Robert Creighton Williams. The film stars Allan Lane, Eddy Waller, Roy Barcroft, John Alvin, Francis McDonald and Fred Graham. The film was released on April 15, 1948, by Republic Pictures.

Plot

Cast   
Allan Lane as Rocky Lane 
Black Jack as Black Jack
Eddy Waller as Sheriff Nugget Clark
Roy Barcroft as Smiling Jim
John Alvin as Don Post
Francis McDonald as Adam Post
Fred Graham as Henchman Smokey
Ed Cassidy as Mort Harris
Edmund Cobb as Deputy Pete
Harold Goodwin as Poker Player
Jack Kirk as Poker Player
Ken Terrell as Bartender Judd 
Marshall Reed as Jailbreak Henchman
Al Murphy as Saloon Piano Player

References

External links 
 

1948 films
American Western (genre) films
1948 Western (genre) films
Republic Pictures films
Films directed by Philip Ford
American black-and-white films
1940s English-language films
1940s American films